Richard Averell Parke (December 13, 1893 – August 23, 1950) was an American bobsledder who competed in the late 1920s. He won a gold medal in the five-man event at the 1928 Winter Olympics in St. Moritz. He graduated from Cornell University where he was a member of Delta Kappa Epsilon.

References
 Bobsleigh five-man Olympic medalists for 1928
 DatabaseOlympics.com profile

1893 births
1950 deaths
American male bobsledders
Bobsledders at the 1928 Winter Olympics
Olympic gold medalists for the United States in bobsleigh
Medalists at the 1928 Winter Olympics
Cornell University alumni
20th-century American people